PVM can refer to:
Parallel Virtual Machine, a software tool for parallel networking of computers
Paged Virtual Memory, a memory addressing scheme that allows non-contiguous memory to be addressed as if it were contiguous
Party of the Vlachs of Macedonia, a political party representing the Aromanians (Vlachs) of North Macedonia
Player versus monsters, also known as player versus environment in computer games
Place Ville Marie, an office complex in Montreal
Projection-valued measure, a type of measure used in functional analysis
Perfetti Van Melle, an Italian-Dutch manufacturer of confectionery and gum
Pro Virtute Medal, a South African military decoration for bravery